New Funky Nation is the debut studio album by the Samoan-American hip hop band Boo-Yaa T.R.I.B.E. It was released in 1990 via 4th & B'way Records/Island Records. Recording sessions took place at Image Recording Studios and Paramount Studios in Hollywood from 1989 to 1990. Production was handled by the Dust Brothers, John O'Brien, Joe Nicolo of the Butcher Bros., Tony G., Suga Pop and Boo-Yaa T.R.I.B.E. The album peaked at #33 in New Zealand, #74 in the UK and #117 in the United States.

The album spawned three singles: "R.A.I.D.", "Psyko Funk" and "Walk the Line".

Critical reception
Trouser Press wrote: "New Funky Nation is an extraordinarily powerful and uncommon hip-hop LP, a rhythmic soul assault of horns, Boo-Yaa bass and violence-prone street rhymes that have an unsettling ring of truth." The Orlando Sentinel wrote that "the raps aren't as strong as the music ... they try to counter the polish of the sound with street tough talk, but the vocals just aren't lean and mean enough to give their Uzi and body-bag motifs any vibrancy." The Washington Post wrote that "the whole Boo-Yaa package -- their look, their background, their musicianship -- is more memorable than any of their songs, with the exception of 'Don't Mess', which has startling changes of tempo and a simple, irresistible vocal hook: 'Boo-Yaa funkin' it up'."

Track listing

Sample credits
"Six Bad Brothers" contains elements from "Fight the Power" by The Isley Brothers (1975) and "N.T." by Kool & the Gang (1971)
"Rated R" contains elements from "It's Yours" by T La Rock and Jazzy Jay
"Don't Mess" contains elements from "Don't Mess With People" by Mandrill (1973)
"T.R.I.B.E." contains elements from "Sun Is Here" by Sun (1978) and "Ain't We Funkin' Now" by The Brothers Johnson (1978)
"R.A.I.D." contains elements from "Raid" by Lakeside (1983) and "Groove Me" by King Floyd (1970)
"Psyko Funk" contains elements from "I'm Chief Kamanawanalea (We're the Royal Macadamia Nuts)" by The Turtles, "Reach Out of the Darkness" by Friend & Lover, "Funky Drummer" by James Brown, "Boogie Shoes" by KC & the Sunshine Band, "Aqua Boogie (A Psychoalphadiscobetabioaquadoloop)" by Parliament

Personnel
Boo-Yaa T.R.I.B.E.
Ted Devoux – lead vocals
Paul Devoux – rap vocals
Roscoe Devoux – vocals
Danny Devoux – backing vocals, bass, additional guitars
David Devoux – backing vocals
Donald DeVoux – backing vocals
Instrumentalists

Vicki Calhoun – backing vocals (tracks: 2-4)
John Myles O'Brien – bass (tracks: 1, 7), guitar (tracks: 4, 7), drum programming (track 6)
Steven Daniells-Silva – guitar (tracks: 1, 6), keyboards (track 6)
Philip Nowlan – organ (tracks: 1, 4)
Tony Gonzalez – turntables (tracks: 1, 9)
Michael S. Simpson – turntables (tracks: 2-3, 5, 10-11)
Fernando Pullum – trumpet (tracks: 4, 7, 10)
Scott Mayo – tenor saxophone (tracks: 4, 7, 10)
Reginald Young – trombone (tracks: 4, 7, 10)
Angel Luis Figueroa – congas (track 5)
Andy "Funky Drummer" Kravitz – percussion (tracks: 6, 8)
Ken Villeneuve – lead & rhythm guitars (track 11)
Phillip "Fish" Fisher – drums

Technicals

Kim Buie – A&R, executive producer
Joseph Mario Nicolo – executive producer, mixing, producer (tracks: 1, 6, 8)
Steven Daniells-Silva – producer (track 1)
John King – producer (tracks: 2-3, 5, 10)
Michael S. Simpson – producer (tracks: 2-3, 5, 10)
John Myles O'Brien – producer (tracks: 4, 7, 11)
Tony Gonzalez – producer (track 9)
Howie Weinberg – mastering
Jason Roberts – engineering
Allen Abrahamson – engineering
Talley Sherwood – engineering
Holly Ferguson – A&R coordinator
Richard Evans – album cover design & art direction
Max Aguilera-Hellweg – photography

Charts

References

External links

1990 debut albums
Boo-Yaa T.R.I.B.E. albums
4th & B'way Records albums
Albums produced by Michael Simpson (producer)
Albums produced by John King (record producer)
Albums produced by the Dust Brothers